Two ships of the Royal Navy have been named HMS Capel:

HMS Capel (BDE-45) was launched in 1942 and allocated to the Royal Navy under Lend-Lease, then reallocated to the US Navy in 1943 and renamed  as an 
 was laid down as the Evarts-class destroyer escort USS  Wintle (DE-266), then transferred to the Royal Navy as the  HMS Capel under Lend-Lease in 1943.

Royal Navy ship names